Automotive hacking is the exploitation of vulnerabilities within the software, hardware, and communication systems of automobiles.

Overview 
Modern automobiles contain hundreds of on-board computers processing everything from vehicle controls to the infotainment system.  These computers, called Electronic control units (ECU), communicate with each other through multiple networks and communication protocols including the Controller Area Network (CAN) for vehicle component communication such as connections between engine and brake control; Local Interconnect Network (LIN) for cheaper vehicle component communication such as between door locks and interior lights; Media Oriented Systems Transport (MOST) for infotainment systems such as modern touchscreen and telematics connections; and  FlexRay for high-speed vehicle component communications such as active suspension and active cruise control data synchronization.

Additional consumer communication systems are also integrated into automobile architectures including Bluetooth for wireless device connections, 4G Internet hotspots, and vehicle Wi-Fi. 

The integration of these various communications and software systems leaves automobiles vulnerable to attack. Security researchers have begun demonstrating the multitude of potential attack vectors in modern vehicles, and some real-world exploits have resulted in manufacturers issuing vehicle recalls and software updates to mobile applications.

Manufacturers, such as John Deere, have used computer systems and Digital Rights Management to prevent repairs by the vehicle owners, or by third parties, or the use of aftermarket parts.   Such limitations have prompted efforts to circumvent these systems, and increased interest in measures such as Motor Vehicle Owners' Right to Repair Act.

Automotive hacking, or CAN Bus Hacking, is often likened to finding a needle in a haystack, as it involves sifting through vast amounts of data and information to pinpoint vulnerabilities within a vehicle's systems. The divide and conquer algorithm, a popular problem-solving technique, can be employed in this process, as it systematically breaks down the complexities of automotive security into smaller, more manageable tasks. This strategy approach allows users to identify and exploit weaknesses more efficiently.

Research 
In 2010, security researchers demonstrated how they could create physical effects and undermine system controls by hacking the ECU.  The researchers needed physical access to the ECU and were able to gain full control over any safety or automotive system including disabling the brakes and stopping the engine.

In a follow-up research paper published in 2011, researchers demonstrated that physical access is not even necessary.  The researchers showed that “remote exploitation is feasible via...mechanics tools, CD players, Bluetooth, cellular radio...and wireless communication channels allow long distance vehicle control, location tracking, in-cabin audio exfiltration and theft”.  This means that a hacker could gain access to a vehicle's vital control systems through almost anything that interfaces with the automobile's systems.

Recent exploits

2015 Fiat Chrysler UConnect Hack 
UConnect is Fiat Chrysler's Internet-connected feature which enables owners the ability to control the vehicle's infotainment/navigation system, sync media, and make phone calls.  It even integrates with the optional on-board WiFi.

However, susceptibilities in Fiat Chrysler’s UConnect system, available on over 1.4 million cars, allows hackers to scan for cars with the system, connect and embed malicious code, and ultimately, commandeer vital vehicle controls like steering and brakes.

2015 Tesla Model S Hack 
In 2015 at the DEF CON hacking conference Marc Rogers and Kevin Mahaffey demonstrated  how a chain of exploits could be used to take complete control of the Model S. Marc Rogers and Kevin Mahaffey identified several remote and local vulnerabilities that could be used as entry points. They demonstrated that after exploitation the vehicle could be remotely controlled with an iPhone. Finally, they also demonstrated that it was possible to install a backdoor that allowed persistent access and control of the vehicle in a similar fashion to exploit techniques more usually associated with traditional computer systems. Marc Rogers and Kevin Mahaffey worked with Tesla, Inc. to resolve the issues before disclosure. It was announced before the presentation that the entire global fleet of Model S cars had been patched overnight, the first proactive mass Over The Air (OTA) security update of vulnerable vehicles.

General Motors OnStar RemoteLink App 
The OnStar RemoteLink app allows users the ability to utilize OnStar capabilities from their Android or iOS smartphones.  The RemoteLink app can locate, lock and unlock, and even start your vehicle.

The flaw in General Motors’ OnStar RemoteLink app, while not as extreme as UConnect, allows hackers to impersonate the victim in the eyes of the RemoteLink app.  This means that the hackers can access all of the features of the RemoteLink app available to the victim including locating, locking and unlocking, and starting the engine.

Keyless entry 

The security researcher Samy Kamkar has demonstrated a device that intercepts signals from keyless-entry fobs and would allow an attacker to unlock doors and start a car's engine.

"USB" entry 
Kia back windows can be broken without setting off an alarm, and Hyundai are similar.
Since 2021, on social media, videos show stealing of post-2010 Kia vehicles and post-2014 Hyundai vehicles, without engine immobilizers, with a USB 1.1 A plug cable, or pliers. Kia started installing immobilizers in 2022.

References 

Hacking (computer security)
Terrorism by method